"When Love Calls Your Name" is a song by Albanian singer Elhaida Dani, written by Richard Cocciante and Roxanne Seeman. Dani performed the song as a contestant of The Voice of Italy during the finale episode on May 30, 2013. Upon being announced as winner of the competition, Cocciante joined Dani on stage for a reprise performance of the song. A studio recording of the song was issued as a single by Universal Music Italia, followed by inclusion in Dani's self-titled album release.

On July 2, 2013, Universal Music Italia released Dani's 7-song EP, including both the studio single recording and the live performance version of "When Love Calls Your Name".

When Love Calls Your Name is track 5 on The Voice of Italy - The Originals released on May 30, 2013 by Universal Music.

Overview 
Originally from Tirana, Albania, Elhaida Dani entered and won singing competitions Star Academy Albania, Top Fest and Festivali i Këngës. At 19, she auditioned for The Voice of Italy and became a member of Team Cocciante.  For the finale episode, Cocciante gave her the song When Love Calls Your Name, which she performed and won, becoming the winner of the first series of the show, with over 70% of the votes.

Cocciante later commented on the song saying it was "a rough stone that Elhaida transformed into a diamond",

Zendee version
Zendee Rose Tenerefe, known mononymously as "Zendee", a Filipina singer who rose to prominence after a video of her singing a karaoke version of Whitney Houston's "I Will Always Love You" went viral on YouTube., recorded "When Love Calls Your Name" on her album "Z", released by MCA Music Universal Philippines on August 7, 2015.

References

2013 songs
Italy
Elhaida Dani songs
Italian pop songs
2013 singles
Songs written by Riccardo Cocciante
Universal Music Group singles
Songs written by Roxanne Seeman

External links 

 https://www.youtube.com/watch?v=ovbqSMi8rKQ
 https://www.youtube.com/watch?v=GXx36ZMazxs&list=OLAK5uy_m9Mf7E1iIQbEaZLtsZjyLXGJ8EcMk4